Ariel Peña Mora (born May 20, 1989) is a Dominican former professional baseball pitcher. He throws a four-seam fastball, a two-seam fastball, a slider and a changeup. He has previously played in Major League Baseball (MLB) for the Milwaukee Brewers.

Career

Los Angeles Angels
Peña signed as an international free agent with the Los Angeles Angels of Anaheim.

Milwaukee Brewers
The Angels traded Peña, Johnny Hellweg, and Jean Segura to the Milwaukee Brewers for Zack Greinke on July 27, 2012.

The Brewers promoted Peña to the major leagues from the Colorado Springs Sky Sox of the Class AAA Pacific Coast League on September 4, 2015. He became the first reliever in Major League history to give up three home runs on Opening Day when Denard Span, Joe Panik and Buster Posey of the San Francisco Giants hit consecutive homers off him in the eighth inning on April 4, 2016.

Rieleros de Aguascalientes
On June 3, 2017, Peña signed with the Rieleros de Aguascalientes of the Mexican Baseball League. He was released on April 11, 2018.

Leones de Yucatán
On August 12, 2018, Peña signed with the Leones de Yucatán of the Mexican League. He became a free agent following the season.

Return to Aguascalientes
On January 25, 2019, Peña signed with the Rieleros de Aguascalientes of the Mexican League. He was released on May 7, 2019.

References

External links

1989 births
Arizona League Angels players
Arkansas Travelers players
Cedar Rapids Kernels players
Colorado Springs Sky Sox managers
Dominican Summer Angels players
Dominican Republic expatriate baseball players in Mexico
Dominican Republic expatriate baseball players in the United States
Huntsville Stars players
Inland Empire 66ers of San Bernardino players

Leones de Yucatán players
Living people
Major League Baseball players from the Dominican Republic
Major League Baseball pitchers
Mexican League baseball pitchers
Milwaukee Brewers players
Nashville Sounds players
Rancho Cucamonga Quakes players
Rieleros de Aguascalientes players
Salt Lake Bees players
Tigres del Licey players